Daniel, Dan, or Danny Jacobs may refer to:

 Dan Jacobs (trumpeter) (born 1942), jazz musician
 Dan Jacobs, lead guitarist of the band Atreyu
 Danie Jacobs (1904-1999), South African Olympic athlete
 Daniel Jacobs (boxer) (born 1987), American professional boxer
 Danny Jacobs (actor) (born 1968), American voice actor
 Danny Jacobs (footballer) (born 1980), former Australian rules footballer

See also
 Danny Jacob (born 1956), American composer, songwriter and guitarist